Athlon is the name of a family of CPUs designed by AMD, targeted mostly at the desktop market. It has been largely unused as just "Athlon" since 2001 when AMD started naming its processors Athlon XP, but in 2008 began referring to single core 64-bit processors from the AMD Athlon X2 and AMD Phenom product lines. Later the name began being used for some APUs.

Features overview

"Pure" CPUs

APUs
APU features table

Athlon (Model 1,K7 "Argon", 250 nm)
 L2 cache always runs with 50% of CPU speed
 All models support: MMX, Enhanced 3DNow!

Athlon (Model 2, K75 "Pluto/Orion", 180 nm)
 L2 cache runs with 50% (up to 700 MHz), 40% (up to 850 MHz) or 33% (up to 1000 MHz) of CPU speed.
 900 - 1000 MHz have Orion designation.
 All models support: MMX, Enhanced 3DNow!

Athlon (Model 4, "Thunderbird", 180 nm)
 L2 cache always runs with full CPU speed
 All models support: MMX, Enhanced 3DNow!

Athlon XP

Athlon 64

Athlon X2

Athlon II

Athlon (Piledriver)

"Trinity" (2012)
 Platform "Virgo"
Fabrication 32 nm on GlobalFoundries SOI process
 Socket FM2
 CPU: Piledriver
 L1 Cache: 16 KB Data per core and 64 KB Instructions per module
 Die Size: , 1.303 Billion transistors
 Support for up to four DIMMs of up to DDR3-1866 memory
 5 GT/s UMI
 Integrated PCIe 2.0 controller, and Turbo Core technology for faster CPU/GPU operation when the thermal specification permits
 MMX, SSE, SSE2, SSE3, SSSE3, SSE4a, SSE4.1, SSE4.2, AMD64, AMD-V, AES, CLMUL, AVX, XOP, FMA3, FMA4, F16C, ABM, BMI1, TBM

"Richland" (2013)
 Fabrication 32 nm on GlobalFoundries SOI process
 Socket FM2
 Two or four CPU cores based on the Piledriver microarchitecture
 Die Size: , 1.303 Billion transistors
 L1 Cache: 16 KB Data per core and 64 KB Instructions per module
 MMX, SSE, SSE2, SSE3, SSSE3, SSE4a, SSE4.1, SSE4.2, AMD64, AMD-V, AES, AVX, AVX1.1, XOP, FMA3, FMA4, F16C, ABM, BMI1, TBM, Turbo Core 3.0, NX bit, PowerNow!

Athlon (Jaguar)

"Kabini" (2013, SoC) 
 Fabrication 28 nm by GlobalFoundries
 Socket AM1, aka Socket FS1b (AM1 platform)
 2 to 4 CPU Cores (Jaguar (microarchitecture))
 L1 Cache: 32 KB Data per core and 32 KB Instructions per core
 MMX, SSE, SSE2, SSE3, SSSE3, SSE4a, SSE4.1, SSE4.2, AMD64, AVX, F16C, CLMUL, AES, MOVBE (Move Big-Endian instruction), XSAVE/XSAVEOPT, ABM, BMI1, AMD-V support
 SoC with integrated memory, PCIe, 2× USB 3.0, 6× USB 2.0, Gigabit Ethernet, and 2× SATA III (6 Gb/s) controllers
 GPU based on Graphics Core Next (GCN)

Athlon (Steamroller, Excavator)

"Kaveri" (2014) & "Godavari" (2015)
 Fabrication 28 nm by GlobalFoundries.
 Socket FM2+, support for PCIe 3.0.
 Two or four CPU cores based on the Steamroller microarchitecture.
Kaveri refresh models have codename Godavari.
 Die Size: , 2.41 Billion transistors.
 L1 Cache: 16 KB Data per core and 96 KB Instructions per module.
 MMX, SSE, SSE2, SSE3, SSSE3, SSE4.1, SSE4.2, SSE4a, AMD64, AMD-V, AES, CLMUL, AVX, AVX 1.1, XOP, FMA3, FMA4, F16C, ABM, BMI1, TBM, Turbo Core
 Dual-channel (2× 64 Bit) DDR3 memory controller.

"Carrizo" (2016)
 Fabrication 28 nm by GlobalFoundries
 Socket FM2+, AM4, support for PCIe 3.0
 Two or four CPU cores based on the Excavator microarchitecture
 Die Size: , 3.1 Billion transistors
 L1 Cache: 32 KB Data per core and 96 KB Instructions per module
 MMX, SSE, SSE2, SSE3, SSSE3, SSE4.1, SSE4.2, SSE4a, AMD64, AMD-V, AES, CLMUL, AVX, AVX 1.1, AVX2, XOP, FMA3, FMA4, F16C, ABM, BMI1, BMI2, TBM, RDRAND, Turbo Core
 Dual-channel DDR3 or DDR4 memory controller

"Bristol Ridge" (2016)
 Fabrication 28 nm by GlobalFoundries
 Socket AM4, support for PCIe 3.0
 Two or four "Excavator+" CPU cores
 L1 Cache: 32 KB Data per core and 96 KB Instructions per module
 MMX, SSE, SSE2, SSE3, SSSE3, SSE4.1, SSE4.2, SSE4a, AMD64, AMD-V, AES, CLMUL, AVX, AVX 1.1, AVX2, XOP, FMA3, FMA4, F16C, ABM, BMI1, BMI2, TBM, RDRAND, Turbo Core
 Dual-channel DDR4 memory controller
 PCI Express 3.0 x8 (No Bifurcation support, requires a PCI-e switch for any configuration other than x8)
 PCI Express 3.0 x4 as link to optional external chipset
 4x USB 3.1 Gen 1
 Storage: 2x SATA and 2x NVMe or 2x PCI Express

Athlon (Zen-based)

Desktop

"Raven Ridge", 14 nm
 Zen CPU cores

"Picasso", 12 nm
 Zen+ CPU cores

Mobile

"Raven Ridge", 14 nm
 Zen CPU cores

"Dalí", 14 nm
 Zen CPU cores

Athlon (Zen 2 based)

Mobile

"Mendocino", 6 nm
 Zen 2 CPU cores
 Fabrication process: TSMC 6 nm FinFET
 Includes integrated RDNA2 GPU
 Athlon Gold 7220U
 Athlon Silver 7120U

See also
 List of AMD processors
 List of AMD Duron processors
 List of AMD Athlon XP processors
 List of AMD Athlon 64 processors
 List of AMD Athlon X2 processors
 List of AMD Athlon II processors
 List of AMD Phenom processors
 List of AMD Opteron processors
 List of AMD Sempron processors
 List of AMD Ryzen processors
 List of Intel processors
 Table of AMD processors

Notes
Note 1:
Athlons use a double data rate (DDR) front-side bus, (EV-6) meaning that the actual data transfer rate of the bus is twice its physical clock rate. The FSB's true data rate, 200 or 266 MT/s, is used in the tables, and the physical clock rates are 100 and 133 MHz, respectively. The multipliers in the tables above apply to the physical clock rate, not the data transfer rate.

References

External links
 AMD technical documentation for Athlon
 AMD Delivers Business-Ready Desktop Offerings to Solution Providers with AMD Business Class Initiative AMD, 28 April 2008

Athlon
AMD Athlon